Hijacking Catastrophe: 9/11, Fear & the Selling of American Empire is a 2004 documentary film narrated by Julian Bond and directed by Jeremy Earp and Sut Jhally. It examines the possibility that neoconservatives used the September 11 attacks to usher in a new doctrine of expanding American power through military force under the guise of a "war on terror" and that the doctrine, known as the Project for the New American Century (PNAC), had been laid out prior to 9/11 by its authors, which include Dick Cheney, Paul Wolfowitz, Donald Rumsfeld, Jeb Bush, and Dan Quayle.

Summary
The film maintains that fear of terrorism was manipulated to support goals which are in step with the PNAC; namely the overthrow of Saddam Hussein. Not just for control of regional strategic resources (natural gas and oil), but to reassert American dominance on the world stage as a warning to potential adversaries. Interviews were conducted with critics such as Noam Chomsky and Nobel Peace Prize laureate Jody Williams. It also interviews policy analysts, military brass, journalists, insider observations from Chief UN Weapons Inspector Scott Ritter and Pentagon whistleblower Lt. Colonel Karen Kwiatkowski.

The historical context of the "Bush Doctrine" is examined and compared to Wolfowitz's PNAC philosophy. The film goes on to look at the "selling of American empire" and the possible economical, social, cultural and political implications it will have in America, and on the world if implemented further during Bush's second term.

Cast

 Tariq Ali
 Benjamin Barber
 Medea Benjamin 
 Noam Chomsky 
 Kevin Danaher
 Mark Danner 
 Shadia Drury
 Michael Dyson 
 Daniel Ellsberg 
 Michael Franti 
 Stan Goff 
 William Hartung 
 Robert Jensen
 Chalmers Johnson 

 Jackson Katz 
 Michael T. Klare 
 Lt. Col. Karen Kwiatkowski (Ret.)
 Norman Mailer
 Zia Mian
 Mark Crispin Miller
 Scott Ritter 
 Vandana Shiva 
 Norman Solomon 
 Greg Speeter
 Fernando Suarez del Solar
 Immanuel Wallerstein 
 Jody Williams 
 Max Wolff

See also
Why We Fight (2005 film)

References

External links
 Hijacking Catastrophe - Official Website
 Media Education Foundation
 
 

2004 films
2004 documentary films
American documentary films
Documentary films about politics
Documentary films about the September 11 attacks
2000s American films